Age to Age is the fourth studio album by Christian music singer Amy Grant, released in 1982 on Myrrh Records.

Age to Age was Amy Grant's breakthrough album, finally earning her serious recognition within the burgeoning Contemporary Christian music community as it ushered her into stardom, and also contributed to the creation of the mold for the modern Contemporary Christian music star. The hit success of the album's first two singles, "Sing Your Praise to the Lord," featuring a piano intro based on J.S. Bach's "Fugue No. 2 in C Minor" from The Well Tempered Clavier, Book 1, and "El Shaddai," saw its sales take off, selling well over a million copies. It became the first Christian music album by a solo artist to be certified gold in 1983, and the first ever platinum Christian music album in 1985.

The album was listed at No. 92 in the 2001 book, CCM Presents: The 100 Greatest Albums in Christian Music and it was one of the fastest-selling specifically Christian albums ever released. It sold about 5 to 6,000 copies a week on average, which was unheard of for a Christian album at the time. Dan Harrell, one of Grant's managers, claimed that it was the fastest selling record in her record company's history. Indeed, it became the first Christian album by a solo artist to be certified gold (1983), and the first Christian album to be certified platinum. It became so popular that it topped Billboards Christian albums chart for 85 weeks, including the entire year of 1983, and was named Gospel Album of the 1980s by Billboard. The album title comes from a prominent lyric in one of the album's most prominent tracks, "El Shaddai".

Track listing

Personnel 

 Amy Grant – lead vocals
 Michael W. Smith – keyboards
 Shane Keister – keyboards
 Jon Goin – guitars
 Mike Brignardello – bass
 Paul Leim – drums
 Terry McMillan – percussion
 Farrell Morris – percussion
 Sheldon Kurland – strings
 Gene Meros – saxophone 
 Denis Solee – saxophone
 Bobby Taylor – woodwinds
 Cindy Reynolds – harp
 Lori Brooks – backing vocals
 Jackie Cusic – backing vocals
 Diana DeWitt – backing vocals
 Phil Forrest – backing vocals
 Gary Chapman – backing vocals
 Pam Mark Hall – backing vocals
 Dennis Henson – backing vocals
 Alan Moore – backing vocals, arrangements, vocal arrangements (5, 9)
 Gary Pigg – backing vocals
 Kathy Troccoli – backing vocals

Production

 Brown Bannister – producer
 Michael Blanton  – executive producer
 Dan Harrell – executive producer
 Jack Joseph Puig – engineer
 Mixed at Mama Jo's Recording Studios, Los Angeles, California
 Steve Hall – mastering at MCA, Whitney, California
 Dennis Hill – design
 Mike Borum – photography

Videos 

A live concert video cassette and LaserDisc was released by A&M Records which includes seven of this album's songs. A music video was produced for "Don't Run Away" featuring Michael W. Smith as the piano player.

Chart history

Weekly charts

Year-end charts

Certifications and sales

Accolades
GMA Dove Awards

Grammy Awards

References 

Amy Grant albums
1982 albums
Albums produced by Brown Bannister
Myrrh Records albums